Jordan Levasseur (born 29 May 1995 in Saint-Saire) is a French cyclist, who currently rides for UCI Continental team .

Major results

Track
2013
 UEC European Junior Track Championships
1st  Madison (with Corentin Ermenault)
2nd  Team pursuit
3rd  Omnium
 1st  Team pursuit, National Junior Track Championships
2016
 National Track Championships
1st  Madison (with Benjamin Thomas)
3rd  Team pursuit

Road

2017
 1st  Overall Paris–Arras Tour
1st Stage 3
 1st Grand Prix de la ville de Nogent-sur-Oise
 Ronde de l'Oise
1st  Points classification
1st Stage 4
 5th Famenne Ardenne Classic
 7th Grand Prix de Fourmies
2018
 8th Paris–Troyes
2019
 1st Stage 3 Ronde de l'Oise
2020
 1st  Overall La Tropicale Amissa Bongo
1st  Sprints classification

References

External links

1995 births
Living people
French male cyclists
Sportspeople from Seine-Maritime
Cyclists from Normandy